Albi Llenga (born 11 June 1989 in Tiranë) is an Albanian footballer who plays as a defender.

Club career
He previously played in Greece and for Bylis Ballsh in the Albanian Superliga. He last played for Whitehawk in 2016.

In January 2019, Llenga joined Proodeftiki FC.

References

External links
 Profile - FSHF

1989 births
Living people
Footballers from Tirana
Albanian footballers
Association football defenders
Albania under-21 international footballers
Ethnikos Piraeus F.C. players
KF Vllaznia Shkodër players
Ilioupoli F.C. players
KF Apolonia Fier players
KF Naftëtari Kuçovë players
KF Bylis Ballsh players
Aiolikos F.C. players
Kalamata F.C. players
Whitehawk F.C. players
Rodos F.C. players
Proodeftiki F.C. players
Kategoria Superiore players
Albanian expatriate footballers
Albanian expatriate sportspeople in Greece
Expatriate footballers in Greece